Doze Ribeiras is a civil parish in the municipality of Angra do Heroísmo on the island of Terceira in Portuguese archipelago of the Azores. The population in 2011 was 513, in an area of 10.41 km².

Architecture
The traditional architecture of Doze Ribeiras resembles much of the rural homes of the western Terceira region, generally constructed around a single floor, many white-washed homes, bordered by multi-coloured trim at the corners, doors and windows.
 Church of São Jorge
 Império of Holy Spirit of Terreiro

References

Freguesias of Angra do Heroísmo